Getting Married is a play by George Bernard Shaw.

Getting Married can also refer to:
Getting Married (collection), a volume of short stories by August Strindberg
Getting Married (1926 film), a Swedish silent drama film
Getting Married (1955 film), a Swedish drama film directed by Anders Henrikson
Getting Married (1978 film), a television film